The Royal Australian and New Zealand College of Ophthalmologists (RANZCO) is the medical college responsible for training and professional development of ophthalmologists in Australia and New Zealand. The headquarters of the College is in Sydney, Australia.

Ophthalmologists who have successfully completed the training program of The Royal Australian and New Zealand College of Ophthalmologists are known as Fellows of the College (FRANZCO).  There are currently about 700 Fellows in Australia.

About
In Australia and New Zealand, an ophthalmologist is required to have undertaken a minimum of 12 years of training, including:
 5–7 years at a medical school, graduating with a degree in medicine,
 2 years (minimum) as a newly qualified doctor undertaking basic medical training,
 5 years of ophthalmic specialist training and successful completion of examinations set by The Royal Australian and New Zealand College of Ophthalmologists (RANZCO).

RANZCO is responsible for training, examining and representing medical practitioners in the specialty of ophthalmology, who upon completion of training, are equipped to undertake unsupervised ophthalmology practice.

RANZCO has a vital interest in the continual improvement and development of ophthalmologists in Australia and New Zealand. The RANZCO Continuing Professional Development (CPD) Program provides Fellows (FRANZCO) with a structured approach to planning their continuing education, and supports activities that cover a wide range of skills, including further clinical knowledge, risk management, clinical governance and professional values. The program consists of three categories reflecting the seven key roles and attributes of a specialist ophthalmologist - Medical Expert, Communicator, Manager, Collaborator, Health Advocate, Scholar and Professional.

RANZCO’s mission is to drive improvements in eye healthcare in Australia, New Zealand and the Asia-Pacific region through continuing exceptional training, education, research and advocacy. Currently, RANZCO participates alongside the International Council of Ophthalmology (ICO), the International Agency for the Prevention of Blindness (IAPB), the Vision2020Australia Global Consortium and the Commonwealth Eye Health Consortium.

History
On 23 March 1938, 20 ophthalmologists from various states gathered in Sydney to form the Ophthalmological Society of Australia of the British Medical Association, with Sir James Barrett as its first President.
Prior to this, the Intercolonial (later Australasian) Medical Congresses had provided the only vehicle for Australian ophthalmologists to meet and exchange professional ideas. Dissatisfaction with this arrangement led to the successful move to create a truly national organisation to represent the profession.

In April 1939, the Ophthalmological Society of Australia held its first annual national scientific meeting in Melbourne. This meeting was followed later in 1939 by the publication of Volume 1 of Transactions of the Ophthalmological Society of Australia, the precursor to the College's current scientific journal.
In the post war years there was growing dissatisfaction about the standard of ophthalmological training in Australia. Qualifications were fragmented and there was no national agreement about the basic determination of competence to practice ophthalmology. Many felt that the setting of national standards and training was a matter for organised ophthalmology, and that this should be carried out by a college rather than a society. In 1968, these views carried the day, and led to the formation of the Australian College of Ophthalmologists in May 1969.

Australian College of Ophthalmologists
The new College absorbed the members, assets, policies and procedures of the Society. In addition, the new Articles of Association provided for the College to supervise the training of aspiring ophthalmologists and conduct examinations to test and recognise their competence. The new arrangements were a considerable success, recognised by the grant of the Royal prefix in 1977.

Royal Australian and New Zealand College of Ophthalmologists
Close links had always existed between Australian and New Zealand ophthalmologists. Reflecting this, there were moves in 1939 to include New Zealand ophthalmologists in the Australian Society. The British Medical Association rules precluded this, however, and the Ophthalmological Society of New Zealand was formed as a separate body.
Despite this setback, the relationship continued between Australian and New Zealand ophthalmologists, culminating in 1997 with the joint decision to form a New Zealand Branch of the College. The final change occurred in November 2000, with the change of name to The Royal Australian and New Zealand College of Ophthalmologists.

Training
The RANZCO trains ophthalmologists through the Vocational Training Program, which typically takes 5 years which includes both basic and advanced training. Trainees rotate through different hospitals for clinical development and training. The 7 key roles underpinning selection, training and assessment are: ophthalmic expert and clinical decision maker, communicator, collaborator, manager, health advocate, scholar, and professional.

In January 2010, the Commonwealth Government's Department of Health and Ageing (DoHA) announced that it was to consolidate a range of programs aimed at establishing training places in settings other than the traditional public teaching hospitals into the one Specialist Training Program (STP). The STP is designed to expand the training opportunities for specialist trainees particularly in rural and private practice settings.

Publications
The college also publishes a scientific journal, Clinical & Experimental Ophthalmology (Clin. Exp. Ophthalmol.).

References

External links
 

Medical and health organisations based in Australia
Medical associations based in Australia
Medical education in Australia
Australian and New Zealand Ophthalmologists
Organisations based in Australia with royal patronage
Medical associations based in New Zealand
Organisations based in New Zealand with royal patronage
1938 establishments in Australia